Derek Edwin Brown (born May 26, 1971) was a member of the Utah House of Representatives from his election in 2010, until his departure in 2014. He represented  House District 49, which constitutes the Sandy and Cottonwood Heights areas. Brown left the legislature in January 2014, when he was selected by US Senator Mike Lee to be his deputy chief of staff.

Professional and Family Life

He is married to Emilie De Azevedo Brown daughter of Lex de Azevedo. The couple has four children and live in Sandy, Utah.
Derek Graduated from Brigham Young University in 1996 with his B.A. in English, and minor degrees in music and business management.  He and his wife were members of BYU's touring performance group, the Young Ambassadors. In 2000, he graduated from Pepperdine University School of Law, where he was editor-in-chief of the Pepperdine Law Review. While at Pepperdine, he also received the First Place Advocate award in the school's Dalsimer Moot Court Competition, as well as the annual Sorenson Writing Award for a published legal comment he wrote on tort law.

After law school, he was a law clerk to Justice Ruggero J. Aldisert Ruggero J. Aldisert of the United States Court of Appeals for the Third Circuit, based in Philadelphia. Following, his time with the U.S. Court of Appeals he then practiced law in Washington, D.C., with the international law firm Sidley & Austin. Brown was part of the Supreme Court and Appellate Practice Group, and authored numerous briefs on issues of constitutional law, including several filed with the U.S. Supreme Court.

Brown left Sidley & Austin when U.S. Senator Bob Bennett (Utah) asked him to serve as his chief counsel in Washington, D.C.  Several years later, Brown relocated his family to his home state of Utah, where he served as Utah counsel to U.S. Senator Orrin Hatch (Utah).

Brown defeated Democratic incumbent Jay Seegmiller in 2010 to win a seat in the Utah House of Representatives, where he served on numerous committees, including serving as Vice Chair of the House Rules Committee.  He also served on the House Judiciary Committee, the House Business & Labor Committee, and the House Law Enforcement & Criminal Justice Committee.  He served in the House until accepting a position as Deputy Chief of Staff for United States Senator Mike Lee, where he managed policy and legal matters for the Senator, and served as the Utah State Director.

After Senator Lee was re-elected in late 2016, Brown accepted a position as Vice President of Government Affairs for 1-800 Contacts, where he managed all of the national government relations affairs for the company, overseeing its 50-state lobbying effort, as well as its government relations efforts in Washington, D.C.  He later left 1-800 Contacts and is currently a partner with the Utah Government Relations Firm Lincoln Hill Partners, where he continues to represent technology and healthcare clients, including 1-800 Contacts.

Brown has also taught as an adjunct professor at Brigham Young University since 2007, where he teaches courses in communications law and ethics.  He serves on the advisory board for Intermountain Homecare, the board of trustees for the Hale Center Theatre, as a board member of the Utah Cultural Alliance, and as the Board Chair for the Foundation for the Utah Schools for the Deaf and Blind.

In 2019, Brown was elected as Chairman of the Utah Republican Party, a position in which he served until his term expired in 2021.  He raised over a million dollars for the party, helped the party escape from debilitating debt, and helped unify a fractured party resulting in historic wins during the 2020 election.  He also pioneered the first online, virtual Utah Republican State Convention, developing and executing the concept in just over six weeks.

Brown is an attorney licensed in the state of Utah, and as part of his law practice, works with Lincoln Hill Partners, referred to as one of the most influential lobbying firms by the Salt Lake Tribune.

2010 Election

Derek was elected in November 2010 with 55.87% of the vote, defeating Democrat Jay Seegmiller.

2012 Election 

Brown won his election in 2012 with approximately 60% of the vote.

References

External links
Derek Brown campaign website
Derek E. Brown Utah Legislature website

1971 births
21st-century American politicians
Brigham Young University alumni
Living people
Republican Party members of the Utah House of Representatives
People associated with Sidley Austin
People from Sandy, Utah
Pepperdine University School of Law alumni
State political party chairs of Utah
Utah lawyers